Paint and Powder is a surviving 1925 American silent drama film produced and released by the Chadwick Pictures. The director of the film was Hunt Stromberg, later be best known as a producer and one of Louis B. Mayer's right hand men over at MGM. The star of this film is Elaine Hammerstein, sister of the music writer and granddaughter of the theatrical impresario, both named Oscar Hammerstein.

Plot
As described in a film magazine review, a waiter in a cheap cabaret loves the premier dancer of the place, and when a noted theatrical producer visits the cabaret, the waiter by deft manipulation obtains his wallet. He dresses the young woman up and tries to put her on Broadway. Later the waiter is sent up the river. When he is released, he finds the young woman married and successful. He is heartbroken but does not try to win her back.

Cast

Preservation
A print of Paint and Powder is held by the Library of Congress and in the George Eastman Museum Motion Picture Collection. It has also been released on DVD.

References

External links

1925 films
American silent feature films
1925 drama films
Silent American drama films
American black-and-white films
Films directed by Hunt Stromberg
1920s American films
1920s English-language films
English-language drama films